Jason Beaulieu (born 12 February 1994) is a Canadian former professional soccer player who played as a goalkeeper.

Early life
Beaulieu was born in Montreal, Quebec, and grew up in the off-island suburb of Boisbriand. He played youth soccer for FC Boisbriand until 2011, when he joined the Montreal Impact Academy.

Club career

Early career
In 2014, Beaulieu played for Première Ligue de soccer du Québec side ACP Montréal-Nord, making four appearances. In fall of that year, he began attending the University of New Mexico, where he made a total of 69 appearances in NCAA Division I over the following four years.

In 2015, Beaulieu played for PLSQ side CS Mont-Royal Outremont, making one appearance. In summer 2017, he played for USL PDL side Albuquerque Sol FC, making four appearances that season.

Montreal Impact
On 9 January 2018, Beaulieu returned to Montreal Impact, then playing in Major League Soccer. Ahead of the 2019 season, Beaulieu was slated to go on loan to USL Championship side Ottawa Fury, but suffered a knee injury requiring surgery in January 2019. After missing six months while recovering from surgery, he was finally loaned to Ottawa Fury on 18 July 2019.

Beaulieu's contract option was declined by the Impact at the end of the 2019 season.

HFX Wanderers
On 5 February 2020, Beaulieu signed with Canadian Premier League side HFX Wanderers. He made his debut for HFX on August 15 against Pacific FC. On 3 November 2020, the club announced that Beaulieu had retired in order to pursue a career in engineering.

Career statistics

Honours
 Canadian Premier League
Runners-up: 2020

References

External links

1994 births
Living people
Association football goalkeepers
Canadian soccer players
Soccer players from Montreal
People from Boisbriand
Homegrown Players (MLS)
Canadian expatriate soccer players
Expatriate soccer players in the United States
Canadian expatriate sportspeople in the United States
CF Montréal players
New Mexico Lobos men's soccer players
Albuquerque Sol FC players
Ottawa Fury FC players
HFX Wanderers FC players
Première ligue de soccer du Québec players
USL League Two players
Canadian Premier League players
ACP Montréal-Nord players
CS Mont-Royal Outremont players